Labour Party also known as Social Democracy in Slovakia was a political party in the post-World War II Slovakia. The party was formed in 1946 by Social Democrats who opposed cooperation with the Communist Party. In 1947 party were incorporated as autonomous regional branch to Czechoslovak Social Democracy. The most influential political figure was Ivan Dérer.

In 1946 Czechoslovak parliamentary election party got two mandates of 300 seats in National Assembly and two mandates of 69 seats in Slovak National Council. After the 1948 Czechoslovak coup d'état, the party was disbanded.

References

Labour parties
Political parties in Czechoslovakia
Political parties established in 1946
1946 establishments in Czechoslovakia
1948 disestablishments in Czechoslovakia
Political parties disestablished in 1948
Social democratic parties in Slovakia